Zhang Desheng (October 1909 – March 4, 1965) also known as Zhang Shide, was a People's Republic of China politician. He was born in Yulin, Shaanxi. He was Chinese Communist Party Committee Secretary of Gansu (1949–1954) and Shaanxi (1954–1965). He died in office in Xi'an.

References

1909 births
1965 deaths
Chinese Communist Party politicians from Shaanxi
CPPCC Chairmen of Shaanxi
Delegates to the 7th National Congress of the Chinese Communist Party
People's Republic of China politicians from Shaanxi
Political office-holders in Gansu
Political office-holders in Shaanxi